Gwenda is a feminine given name of Welsh origin. It was apparently derived in the 19th century using the Welsh adjectives gwen "white, fair, blessed" and da "good", and may be a variant of Gwendolen (otherwise Gwendaline), or a feminine form of Gwyndaf, a Welsh saint.

'Gwenda' first appears in the UK General Register Office registration of births in the September 1874 Quarter, and for marriages in the June 1861 Quarter.  It was "regularly used until the 1960s, now rare."

Notable people named Gwenda
Gwenda Blair (born 1943), American nonfiction author
Gwenda Bond (born 1976), American writer
Gwenda Deacon (1946–2006), American actress
Gwenda Evans, British costume designer
Gwenda Ewen, British actress
Gwenda Hawkes (1894–1990), British racing driver 
Gwenda Lorenzetti, Canadian actress
Gwenda Morgan (1908–1991), British artist
 (born 1965), Welsh singer
Gwenda Thomas (born 1942), Welsh politician
Gwenda Wilson (1921–1977), British television and radio actress
Gwenda Young, Irish film scholar and author

Fictional characters
Gwenda Halliday in the Agatha Christie novel Sleeping Murder (1976)
Gwenda Vaughan in the Agatha Christie novel Ordeal by Innocence (1958)

See also
Glenda (given name) ("came rather later [than Gwenda] and may have been suggested by this name")
Gwen (given name)
Wendy
Cyclone Gwenda

References

English feminine given names
Welsh feminine given names